Evangelia Heretika is the third video album by Polish extreme metal band Behemoth. It was released on 9 November 2010.

On 13 March 2011 Evangelia Heretika was certified platinum in Poland.

Track listing

Disc 1

Disc 2

CD

Personnel 
 Behemoth
Adam "Nergal" Darski – lead vocals, rhythm guitar
Zbigniew "Inferno" Promiński – drums, percussion
Tomasz "Orion" Wróblewski – bass, backing vocals, co-lead vocals on "Wolves Guard my Coffin" and "At the Left Hand of God"
 Additional musicians
Patryk "Seth" Sztyber – lead guitar, backing vocals

Release history

Charts

References 

Behemoth (band) video albums
2010 live albums
Live video albums
2010 video albums
Metal Blade Records video albums
Metal Blade Records live albums
Polish-language albums